1938 in philosophy

Events 
September 2 – B. F. Skinner's ground-breaking book The Behavior of Organisms was first published. Of the 800 copies in the first printing, only 548 had been sold by 1946.

Publications 
 John Dewey, Logic: The Theory of Inquiry and Experience and Education
 Johan Huizinga, Homo Ludens
 Bertrand Russell, Power: A New Social Analysis
 Albert Einstein and Leopold Infeld, The Evolution of Physics
 Karl Jaspers, Philosophy of Existence
 Lewis Mumford, The Culture of Cities
 Henri de Lubac, Catholicism: Christ and the Common Destiny of Man
 Charles W. Morris, Foundations of the Theory of Signs
 Jean-Paul Sartre, Nausea (novel)
 Alan Turing, Systems of Logic Based on Ordinals
 Jean Wahl, Kierkegaardian Studies

Births 
 April 11 - Muhammad Shahrur, Syrian thinker and author (died 2019)
 July 8 - Justin Leiber (died 2016)
 July 10 - David Hugh Mellor, English philosopher (died 2020)
 August 3 - Remo Bodei (died 2019)
 November 16 - Robert Nozick (died 2002)

Deaths 
 March 27 - William Stern (born 1871)
 April 26 - Edmund Husserl (born 1859)

References 

Philosophy
20th-century philosophy
Philosophy by year